Konrad Krajewski (born 25 November 1963) is a Polish cardinal of the Catholic Church. He was a papal master of ceremonies from 1998 to 2013. In 2013 he was appointed as the papal almoner.

Pope Francis created him a cardinal on 28 June 2018.

Life
Krajewski was born in Łódź, Poland. In 1982 he entered the seminary of the Archdiocese of Łódź. He earned a degree in theology from the Catholic University of Lublin and was ordained a priest on 11 June 1988. After ordination, he served the diocese for two years in pastoral work.

In 1990 Krajewski continued his studies at the Liturgical Institute of St. Anselmo in Rome. On 5 March 1993 he obtained his Licentiate in Sacred Liturgy. Krajewski earned a Doctorate in Theology from the Pontifical University of Saint Thomas Aquinas in 1995 with a dissertation entitled L'ordinazione episcopale nella riforma del Concilio Vaticano II ("Episcopal ordination in the reform of Vatican II"). During his stay in Rome Krajewski collaborated with the Office for the Liturgical Celebrations of the Supreme Pontiff.

He returned to his diocese in 1995 and served as master of ceremonies for the archbishop and taught catholic liturgy at the seminary and to the Franciscans and Salesians. In 1998 he returned to Rome to work in the Office of Liturgical Celebrations of the Supreme Pontiff. On 12 May 1999, Pope John Paul II appointed him a Papal Master of Ceremonies.

On 3 August 2013, Pope Francis appointed him Papal Almoner, the formal title of which office is "Almoner of His Holiness." At the same time, he was made Titular Archbishop of Beneventum. He was consecrated on 17 September 2013 by Cardinal Giuseppe Bertello with Archbishops Piero Marini and Władysław Ziółek as co-consecrators. Pope Francis attended the consecration.

On the Pope's behalf, the almoner carries out acts of charity and raises the money to fund them. Krajewski's office funds its work by selling customized parchments with a photograph of the pope and an inscription in calligraphy that document papal blessings granted on a special occasion, such as a wedding, baptism or priestly ordination. All proceeds go directly to the works of charity. In 2012, the office spent one million Euro (US$1.4 million) on 6,500 requests for help.

Krajewski described how Francis has redefined the little-known office of papal almoner: "The Holy Father told me at the beginning: 'You can sell your desk. You don't need it. You need to get out of the Vatican. Don't wait for people to come ringing. You need to go out and look for the poor'", Krajewski said. Requests for aid that the pope receives are delivered to the almoner daily, sometimes accompanied with notations in the pope's hand. Archbishop Krajewski has visited homes for the elderly and distributed funds to the needy. He spent four days on the island of Lampedusa after a migrant boat carrying Eritreans capsized, praying with police divers as they worked to raise the dead from the sea floor. In June 2015 Archbishop Krajewski announced plans for a thirty-bed, volunteer-run dormitory for the homeless near the Vatican. Krajewski said the entire initiative was aimed at "giving people their dignity." It opened in October 2015.

Pope Francis made him a cardinal on 28 June 2018, assigning him the titular church of Santa Maria Immacolata all'Esquilino.

On 11 May 2019 Krajewski climbed down a manhole cover in a Rome street to break a seal and switch back on the electricity supply to a building where 450 people were squatting, including 100 children, thereby restoring power and hot water which they had been without for five days.  The squatters included migrants. Krajewski was criticised on Twitter by Matteo Salvini, the Deputy Prime Minister of Italy, for his action but responded by telling the Italian newspaper Corriere della Sera: "From now on.... I'll pay the bills; indeed I will even pay his" [Salvini's bill].

Krajewski received significant positive attention in early May 2020 when he wired charity money for food to a group of transgender sex workers who had been left out of a job due to the COVID-19 pandemic. Krajewski expressed surprise at the attention given to this action, as he defined it within the normal charitable works of the Catholic Church.

In March 2022, in response to the Russian invasion of Ukraine, Pope Francis sent Krajewski as a special envoy to Ukraine, along with Cardinal Michael Czerny, who is head of the papal office that deals with migration, charity, justice and peace. This mission, which involved several trips, was considered a highly unusual move of Vatican diplomacy.

See also
Cardinals created by Francis

References

External links

 

Living people
1963 births
Polish Roman Catholic titular archbishops
21st-century Polish cardinals
Pontifical University of Saint Thomas Aquinas alumni
Clergy from Łódź
Cardinals created by Pope Francis
Officials of the Roman Curia
Squatting in Italy